Chirolophis ascanii, or Yarrell's blenny, is a species of fish belonging to the family Stichaeidae.

It is native to Northern European coasts.

References

ascanii